Alfred Firmin Loisy (28 February 18571 June 1940) was a French Roman Catholic priest, professor and theologian generally credited as a founder of modernism in the Roman Catholic Church. He was a critic of traditional views of the interpretation of the Bible, and argued that biblical criticism could be helpful for a theological interpretation of the Bible.

He famously wrote "Jesus announced the kingdom, and it is the Church that came".

His theological positions brought him into conflict with the church's authorities, including Pope Leo XIII and Pope Pius X. In 1893, he was dismissed as a professor from the Institut Catholique de Paris.  His books were condemned by the Roman Curia, and in 1908 he was excommunicated.

Education 
Born on 28 February 1857 at Ambrières, Loisy was put into the ecclesiastical school of Saint-Dizier at four years old. He decided for the priesthood and was educated from 1874 to 1879 at the Grand séminaire de Châlons-en-Champagne; he entered the Institut Catholique de Paris in 1878/1879. Prior to his ordination to the subdiaconate, he had experienced doubts regarding the soundness of the Catholic faith. After an illness he returned to the Institut and was ordained a priest on 29 June 1879. Initially assigned parish work, in 1881 he requested to be reassigned to the Institut to complete his baccalauréat in theology. That autumn he became instructor in Hebrew. He took additional courses in Hebrew with Ernest Renan at the Collège de France. He was also influenced, as to biblical languages and textual criticism, by the Abbé Paulin Martin, and as to a consciousness of the biblical problems and a sense of form by the historical intuition and irony of Abbé Louis Duchesne. He took his theological degree in March 1890, by the oral defense of forty Latin scholastic theses and by a French dissertation, Histoire du canon de l'ancien testament, published as his first book in that year.

Early Biblical criticism 
Some of his work appeared in the bi-monthly L'Enseignement biblique, a periodical written throughout and published by himself. In November 1893, Loisy published the last lecture of his course, in which he summed up his position on Biblical criticism in five propositions: the Pentateuch was not the work of Moses, the first five chapters of Genesis were not literal history, the New Testament and the Old Testament did not possess equal historical value, there was a development in scriptural doctrine, and Biblical writings were subject to the same limitations as those by other authors of the ancient world. This resulted in Loisy's dismissal from his teaching position. A few days later Pope Leo XIII published the encyclical Providentissimus Deus, which indirectly condemned  Abbé Loisy's and Mgr d'Hulst's position, and rendered the continued publication of consistently critical work so difficult that Loisy himself suppressed his Enseignement at the end of 1893.

Historical apologetics for the development of the Catholic Church
His 1908 Les Évangiles Synoptiques would cause his excommunication. In his works he argued against the views of Adolf von Harnack, the German Lutheran theologian, trying to show that it was necessary and inevitable for the Catholic Church to form as it did. In doing so, Loisy implicitly accepted the eschatology of Johannes Weiss (this eschatology is named consistent eschatology): Jesus thought the coming of the Kingdom was imminent, so there was no point in founding a Church. Only after his death and resurrection his original proclamation of the Kingdom was transformed in this sense by his disciples, and legitimately so, as Loisy pointed out against Harnack's conception of Christianity:  The second part of the quotation echoes Cardinal Newman's theory on the development of Christian doctrine which Loisy had studied in his time at Neuilly. Although L'Évangile et L'Église in particular was condemned by Cardinal Richard, Pope Leo consistently refused to interfere directly. It was his successor, Pope Pius X who would later condemn these works.

Another controversial thesis of Loisy, developed in La Religion d'Israël, is the distinction between a pre-Moses period, when the Hebrews worshipped the god El, also known by the plural of this name, Elohim, and a later stage, when Yahweh gradually became the  only deity of the Jews.

Pope Pius X
Cardinal Sarto became Pope Pius X on 4 August 1903. On 1 October, Loisy published three new books, Autour d'un petit livre, Le Quatrième Évangile and Le Discours sur la Montagne (a fragment of a proposed enlarged commentary on the Synoptic Gospels). Autour consists of seven letters on different topics addressed to church leaders and friends. Urged by the Parisian Archbishop Cardinal Richard, Pius X transferred the scrutiny of Loisy's books, started under Leo XIII in 1901 under the Congregation of the Index, to the Holy Office. By 23 December 1903, the Congretation censured Loisy's main exegetical works: Religion d'Israël, L'Évangile et l'Église, Études évangéliques, Autour d'un petit livre and Le Quatrième Évangile.

Condemnation 
On 12 January 1904 Loisy wrote to the Vatican Secretary of State, Cardinal Merry del Val, that he received the condemnation with respect, and condemned whatever might be reprehensible in his books, whilst reserving the rights of his conscience and his opinions as an historian. The Holy See was not satisfied, and Loisy sent three further declarations; the last, dispatched on 17 March, was addressed to the pope himself, and remained unanswered. At the end of March, Loisy gave up his lectureship, as he declared, on his own initiative. In April 1907 he returned to his native Lorraine, to his relatives in Ceffonds near Montier-en-Der.

In 1904 the Holy Office began to compile a syllabus of errors in the works of Loisy. Due to ongoing internal resistance, especially from the Master of the Sacred Palace, the papal theologian Alberto Lepidi, this syllabus was published only in July 1907 as the decree Lamentabili sane exitu (or "A Lamentable Departure Indeed"); it condemned sixty-five propositions from the field of biblical interpretation and the history of dogma. They concerned the nature of the church, revelation, biblical exegesis, the sacraments, and the divinity of Christ. This was followed a year later by the encyclical Pascendi dominici gregis ("Feeding the Lord's Flock"), which characterized modernism as the "synthesis of all heresies". The documents made Loisy realise that there was no hope for reconciliation of his views with official Catholic doctrine. He made a comparative study of the papal documents to show the condemned propositions in his own writings. He also asserted as true various of his earlier New Testament interpretations, which previously he had formulated in conditional form. In his diary he wrote:

His Catholic critics commented that his religious system envisions a great society which he believed to be the historical development the Church. For many, the attitude of Loisy and his followers was incomprehensible. Modernists asked, "How can the Church survive?"; while for Pius X the question was, "How can these men be priests?"

The censure did not deter Loisy from publishing three further books. Les Évangiles synoptiques, two large volumes of 1,009 and 798 pages, appeared in January 1908. This contains a detailed commentary on the Synoptic Gospels, combining the ecclesiastical tradition, modern criticism, the Gospel narrative, and the tradition of the text and the previous commentaries. The commentary gives also a careful translation of the texts. Loisy recognizes two eye-witness documents, as utilized by all three Gospels. He traces a strong Pauline influence, especially in the Gospel of Mark. Yet the great bulk of the sayings is acknowledged as substantially authentic; if the historicity of certain words and acts is here denied with unusual assurance, that of other sayings and deeds is established with stronger proofs; and the redemptive conception of the Passion and the sacramental interpretation of the Last Supper are found to spring up promptly and legitimately from Christ's work and words.

The third book, Simples Réflexions sur le décret Lamentabili et sur l'encyclique Pascendi (277 pages), was published from Ceffonds a few days after the commentary. Each proposition of the decree is carefully tracked to its probable source, and is often found to modify the latter's meaning. The study of the encyclical concludes: "Time is the great teacher […] we would do wrong to despair either of our civilization or of the Church."

The ecclesiastical authorities were not slow to act. On 14 February 1908 Léon-Adolphe Amette, archbishop of Paris, prohibited his diocesans to read or defend the two books, which "attack and deny several fundamental dogmas of Christianity," under pain of excommunication.

Excommunication 
Loisy was excommunicated vitandus on 7 March 1908. 

After his excommunication Loisy became a secular intellectual. He was appointed Chair of History of Religions in the Collège de France in 1909 and served there until retiring in 1931. In that post, he continued to develop his philosophy, describing the Christian religion as a humanist system of ethics rather than divine. He also developed his studies of early religions and their influence on Christianity. He never recanted, and died in 1940 in Ceffonds.

Writings

 - Eng. trans. of L'Evangile et l'Eglise

 - Eng. trans. of La religion d'Israël

 - Eng. trans. of Choses passées

 
 - Eng. trans. of La naissance du Christianisme
 - Eng. trans. of Les origines du Nouveau Testament

See also
Catholic Church in France

References

Sources

Further reading 
 Biagioli, Ilaria; Laplanche, François; Langlois, Claude  (eds), Autour d'un petit livre. Alfred Loisy cent ans après, Paris, Brepols, 2007.
 Boynton, Richard Wilson. "The Catholic Career of Alfred Loisy," The Harvard Theological Review, Vol. XI, 1918.
 
 
 Loisy, Alfred. L'Évangile et l'Église  (Paris: Picard, 1902); transl. as The Gospel and the Church (Philadelphia: Fortress, 1976)
 Mueller, Andreas Uwe, Christlicher Glaube und historische Kritik. Maurice Blondel und Alfred Loisy im Ringen um das Verhaeltnis von Schrift und Tradition (Freiburg, Herder, 2008).
 
 Vieban, A. "A Critical Valuation of Loisy's Theories," The Ecclesiastical Review, Vol. XL, 1909.
 .

1857 births
1940 deaths
19th-century French Roman Catholic priests
20th-century French Catholic theologians
20th-century French Roman Catholic priests
Academic staff of the Collège de France
French historians of religion
Modernism in the Catholic Church
New Testament scholars
People excommunicated by the Catholic Church
People from Haute-Marne
Roman Catholic biblical scholars
Dissident Roman Catholic theologians